Franklin Township is a township in Decatur County, Iowa, USA.  As of the 2000 census, its population was 370.

Geography
Franklin Township covers an area of 36.19 square miles (93.74 square kilometers); of this, 0.03 square miles (0.07 square kilometers) or 0.07 percent is water.

Cities and towns
 Weldon

Adjacent townships
 Green Bay Township, Clarke County (north)
 Franklin Township, Clarke County (northeast)
 Garden Grove Township (east)
 High Point Township (southeast)
 Center Township (south)
 Decatur Township (southwest)
 Long Creek Township (west)
 Knox Township, Clarke County (northwest)

Cemeteries
The township contains two cemeteries: Johnson and Kline.

Major highways
 U.S. Route 69

References
 U.S. Board on Geographic Names (GNIS)
 United States Census Bureau cartographic boundary files

External links
 US-Counties.com
 City-Data.com

Townships in Decatur County, Iowa
Townships in Iowa